Dario Tadić (born 11 May 1990) is an Austrian professional footballer who plays as a forward for Austrian Bundesliga club TSV Hartberg.

Born in Odžak, SR Bosnia and Herzegovina, SFR Yugoslavia, he decided to play for the Austrian U19 team.

Honours

Individual
Austrian Cup Top goalscorer: 2017–18

References

1990 births
Living people
People from Odžak
Austrian footballers
Association football forwards
Austrian Football Bundesliga players
FK Austria Wien players
SC Wiener Neustadt players
SC Austria Lustenau players
TSV Hartberg players
2. Liga (Austria) players
Austrian people of Bosnia and Herzegovina descent
Bosnia and Herzegovina emigrants to Austria
Austria youth international footballers
Austria under-21 international footballers